Harry Barris (November 24, 1905 – December 13, 1962) was an American popular singer and songwriter. He was one of the earliest singers to use "scat singing" in recordings. Barris, one of Paul Whiteman's Rhythm Boys, along with Bing Crosby and Al Rinker, scatted on several songs, including "Mississippi Mud," which Barris wrote in 1927.

Biography
Barris was born to Jewish parents in New York City. Gary Giddins described him as "small, wiry, and moon-faced with glittery eyes, and dark hair slicked back and parted in the middle." He was educated in Denver, Colorado. Barris became a professional pianist at the age of 14. He led a band which toured the Far East at the age of 17.

Barris married Hazelle Thompson in 1925 and they had a daughter, Hazelle Barris, in 1926.

The same year, Barris played the piano and occasionally sang in Paul Ash's orchestra. In the same year, Al Rinker and Bing Crosby became members of Paul Whiteman's Orchestra as a singing duo. However, appearing at the vast New York Paramount in February 1927, where there were no microphones, they could not be heard by the audience. They were promptly dropped from the bill. However, a band member who knew Barris suggested that they add him to make a trio and The Rhythm Boys were formed in April 1927.

In 1930, Barris divorced Hazelle Thompson. The Rhythm Boys left Paul Whiteman the same year and joined Gus Arnheim's Cocoanut Grove Orchestra. They made one more recording together, "Them There Eyes" (November 20, 1930), but the boys decided to quit in May 1931 and they went their separate ways. However, Barris changed his mind and returned to the Cocoanut Grove to complete his contract. Barris joined Arnheim's singing group The Three Ambassadors. Barris met Loyce Whiteman, who also sang with the Orchestra, and married her in 1931. They appear together in an episode of Rambling 'Round Radio Row. They had one daughter, Marti Barris, who also became a musician. They divorced in 1946.

Barris appeared in 57 films between 1931 and 1950, usually as a band member, pianist and/or singer. Seven of those films had Bing Crosby as the star. In 1932, Barris signed a contract to star in six shorts for Educational Pictures, similar to Bing Crosby's launch into films. The first of these shorts was That Rascal. In The Lost Weekend (1945), he is the nightclub pianist who humiliates Ray Milland by singing "Somebody Stole My Purse". An unusual change of pace for Barris was his comedy role in The Fleet's In (1942), as a runty sailor named Pee Wee who perpetrates malapropisms in a surprisingly deep voice.

During World War II, Barris, along with Joe E. Brown, went overseas to entertain troops.

Barris had a lifelong drinking problem. In a fall, he fractured his hip in March 1961. Despite a series of operations, his condition deteriorated. He died in Burbank, California, aged 57. His composition "Never Been So Lost" was published shortly before his death.

Compositions

 "Hong Kong Dream Girl" (1924), with George E. Springer
 "'Tain't Cold" (1925), with Jack Mills
 "And She'll Do It For a Long, Long Time" (1926)
 "Brown Sugar" (1926)
 "I'm Out in Nowhere, Going to Go Somewhere" (1926)
 "I Got a Sweet Lil' Girl" (1926)
 "Jimmy-Da-Walk, Da Boss-A New York" (1926), with Howard Johnson and James Cavanaugh
 "Why Does My Sweetie Love (Nobody But Me)" (1926), with Irving Mills
 "Mississippi Mud" (1927), with James Cavanaugh
 "That's Grandma" (1927), with Bing Crosby and James Cavanaugh
 "Play It, Red" (1927)
 "Sweet L'il" (1927)
 "From Monday On" (1928), with Bing Crosby
 "Wa-Da-Da (Ev'rybody's Doin' It Now)" (1928), with James Cavanaugh
 "What Price Lyrics?" (1928), with Bing Crosby and Matty Malneck
 "My Blue Print of Dreams" (1929), with Billy Moll
 "So the Bluebirds and the Blackbirds Got Together" (1929), with Billy Moll
 "That's What's Troubling Me" (1929), with Billy Moll
 "Ev'rything's Agreed Upon" (1930), with Bing Crosby
 "At Your Command" (1931), with Bing Crosby and Harry Tobias
 "Chances Are" (1931), with Gus Arnheim and Ralph Freed
 "It's the Darndest Thing" (1931)
 "I Surrender Dear" (1931), with Gordon Clifford
 "It Must Be True" (1931), with Gordon Clifford
 "Lies" (1931), with George E. Springer
 "What Good Would Be Tomorrow (Without You, Dear)" (1931), with Gus Arnheim and Ralph Freed
 "What Is It?" (1931), with Harry Tobias
 "Wrap Your Troubles in Dreams" (1931), with Ted Koehler and Billy Moll
 "I Got the Ritz from the One I Love (I Got the Big Go-By)" (1932), with J. C. Lewis
 "It Was So Beautiful" (1932), with Arthur Freed
 "Music Has Charms" (1932), with J. C. Lewis
 "We're Alone" (1932), with Arthur Freed
 "It Will Be Too Bad for You" (1933)
 "Let's Spend an Evening at Home (1933), with Ralph Freed
 "I'm Satisfied" (1934), with Ralph Freed
 "Little Dutch Mill" (1934), with Ralph Freed
 "Lonesome China Boy" (1934), with Mort Greene
 "Flirtation" (1935), with Mort Greene
 "Thrilled" (1935), with Mort Greene
 "Beyond Compare" (1936), with Mort Greene
 "Naturally" (1938), with Joseph McCarthy
 "Neighbors in the Sky" (1939)
 "Never Been So Lost" (1962)

Partial filmography

King of Jazz (1930) - One of the Rhythm Boys
Two Plus Fours (1930, Short) - Harry
Confessions of a Co-Ed (1931) - Harry
The Spirit of Notre Dame (1931) - Wasp
That Rascal (1932, Short)
The Cohens and Kellys in Hollywood (1932) - Pianist (uncredited)
He's a Honey (1932, Short)
Now's the Time (1932, Short)
Rambling 'Round Radio Row (1932, Short) - Himself - Pianist / Singer
Secret Sinners (1933) - Harry Barris - Pianist
Hot Competition (1933)
Hollywood Party (1934) - Singer of 'Feelin' High' (uncredited)
Love Me Forever (1935) - Piano Player (uncredited)
After the Dance (1935) - Tommy Tucker (scenes deleted)
Every Night at Eight (1935) - Harry
Show Boat (1936) - Jake - Pianist (uncredited)
The Man I Marry (1936) - Piano Player
Double or Nothing (1937) - Sing Orchestra Leader
Something to Sing About (1937) - Pinky - Band Pianist
Cowboy from Brooklyn (1938) - Louie
Sing You Sinners (1938) - Moose - Orchestra Leader (uncredited)
The Shining Hour (1938) - Bertie
Trade Winds (1938) - Pianist (uncredited)
Some Like It Hot (1939) - Harry, Piano Player
Rhythm on the River (1940) - Bass Sax Player
Blondie Goes Latin (1941) - Musician (uncredited)
West Point Widow (1941) - Hot Dog Vendor (uncredited)
Kiss the Boys Goodbye (1941) - Fisher's Publicity Agent
Birth of the Blues (1941) - Suds
Sing for Your Supper (1941) - Jimmy (uncredited)
The Fleet's In (1942) - Pee Wee (uncredited)
True to the Army (1942) - Piano Player (uncredited)
Priorities on Parade (1942) - Harvey Erkimer
Holiday Inn (1942) - Midnight Club Orchestra Leader (uncredited)
Footlight Serenade (1942) - Composer (uncredited)
Happy Go Lucky (1943) - Master of Ceremonies (uncredited)
The Youngest Profession (1943) - Man Watching Mr. Hercules' Show (uncredited)
Salute for Three (1943) - Second Sailor at Canteen Sailors' Table (uncredited)
Dixie (1943) - Drummer / Minstrel (uncredited)
Is Everybody Happy? (1943) - Bob
Hey, Rookie (1944) - Pianist (uncredited)
And the Angels Sing (1944) - Saxy
San Diego, I Love You (1944) - Clarinetist (uncredited)
My Gal Loves Music (1944) - Band Leader (uncredited)
Here Come the Waves (1944) - Bandleader (uncredited)
Rough, Tough and Ready (1945) -  Eddie Coburn (uncredited)
Penthouse Rhythm (1945) - Tim Noonan
You Came Along (1945) Bandleader (uncredited)
Steppin' in Society (1945) - Ivory
Anchors Aweigh (1945) - Sailor Asking Joe to Get Autographs (uncredited)
Week-End at the Waldorf (1945) - Anna's Boyfriend (uncredited)
The Lost Weekend (1945) - Pianist at Harry & Joe's (uncredited)
Young Widow (1946) - Officer's Club Pianist (uncredited)
The Blue Dahlia (1946) - Bellhop (uncredited)
Susie Steps Out (1946) - Ned
You Were Meant for Me (1948) - Pianist - Member of the Band (uncredited)
Three Little Words (1950) - Pianist at Party (uncredited)
A Life of Her Own (1950) - Party Piano Player (uncredited) (final film role)

Solo recordings

In 1926, Barris, billed as "Happy Harry Barris," made a solo record performing his own composition, "And She'll Do It For a Long, Long Time" (Cameo 1080), showcasing his talents as a pianist, vocalist, and songwriter. While this record survives, his few other solos recorded in 1926 have been destroyed. They include:
 "Could I, I Certainly Could" (Victor Matrix BVE-37174)
 "I'm Out in Nowhere, Going to Go Somewhere" (Victor Matrix BVE-37175)
 "I Got a Sweet Lil' Girl" (Victor Matrix BVE-37176)

During the 1930s, it was uncommon to hear Barris perform completely solo outside of films. A rare example is a Cocoanut Grove broadcast tape of "It's the Darndest Thing."

References

Sources
Donald Shepherd and Robert F. Slatzer, Bing Crosby: The Hollow Man (New York: St. Martin's Press, 1981),

External links

Harry Barris recordings at the Discography of American Historical Recordings.

1905 births
1962 deaths
American male singer-songwriters
Singers from New York City
Burials at Forest Lawn Memorial Park (Hollywood Hills)
20th-century American singers
Bing Crosby
Articles containing video clips
20th-century American male singers
Singer-songwriters from New York (state)